Offside, off-side or off side may refer to:

Sport
 Offside (sport), a rule in a number of field team sports designed to help ensure players move together as a team
 Offside (association football) 
 Offside (American football) 
 Offside (bandy)
 Offside (rugby) 
 Offside (ice hockey) 
 Offside (field hockey)
 Off side, a side of the field in cricket fielding

Media
 Offside (TV series), Scottish football programme
 , a Japanese football manga from Natsuko Heiuchi
 Offside (2000 film), a 2000 Turkish comedy-drama film
 Offside (2005 film), German film
 Offside (2006 Iranian film), Iranian film
 Offside (2006 Swedish film), Swedish film
 Offside (magazine), Swedish football magazine
 Offside (book), Spanish novel from Manuel Vázquez Montalbán
 Off Sides (Pigs vs. Freaks), 1980s American film starring Eugene Roche, Grant Goodeve and Tony Randall

Other uses
 Offside, the side of the car furthest from the curb; See Right- and left-hand traffic
 Off-side rule, an interpretation for indentation in some computer programming languages